Sosnovskoye is an urban locality (an urban-type settlement) in Sosnovsky District of Nizhny Novgorod Oblast, Russia. Population:

References

Urban-type settlements in Nizhny Novgorod Oblast
Sosnovsky District, Nizhny Novgorod Oblast